El Reportero (The Reporter) may refer to:

 El Reportero (North Alabama newspaper)
 El Reportero ( Puerto Rican newspaper)
 El Reportero (San Francisco newspaper)'', bilingual newspaper
 El Reportero (1968 film), with actor Amador Bendayán
 El Reportero (1974 film), directed by Michelangelo Antonioni

See also 
 The Reporter (disambiguation)